Shōzō, Shozo, Shouzou or Shohzoh (written: 昭三, 省三, 省蔵, 省太, 正三, 正蔵 or 昌三) is a masculine Japanese given name. Notable people with the name include:

, Japanese judoka
, Japanese historian
, Japanese comedian and voice actor
, Japanese voice actor
, Japanese speed skater
, Japanese video game designer
, Japanese businessman and shipbuilder
, Japanese photographer
, Japanese professional wrestler and actor
, Japanese politician
, Japanese film director, producer and businessman
, Japanese swimmer
Shozo Miyamoto (born 1940), Japanese golfer
, Japanese businessman, politician and diplomat
, Japanese playwright
, Japanese playwright
, Japanese boxer
, Japanese general
, Japanese sport wrestler
, Japanese biathlete
, Japanese artist
Shozo Tominaga (died 2002), Japanese activist
, Japanese footballer
, Japanese translator and academic

Japanese masculine given names